Manitoulinoceras is a genus of Late Ordovician oncocerid nautiloid cephalopods, found in North America (Kentucky, Ohio, Indiana, and Ontario).  The shell is cyrtoconic, exogastric, more strongly curved than in Kindleoceras.  The cross-section is somewhat wider than high, with a somewhat flattened upper side, known as the dorsum.  Actinosiphonate deposits in the siphuncle are confined to the early part of the phragmocone.

Staufferoceras, a valcuouroceratid from the Middle and Upper Ordovician of Minnesota and Ohio named by Foeste, 1932,  is much like Manitoulinoceras but with a living chamber that is swollen in the middle, narrowing toward the aperture.

References

 Walter C Sweet, 1964  Nautiloidea-Oncocerida.  Treatise on Invertebrate Paleontology Part K Mollusca 3. Geological Society of America and University of Kansas Press.

Prehistoric nautiloid genera
Paleozoic life of Ontario
Oncocerida